The Kid Line was a NHL line for the Toronto Maple Leafs in the 1930s. It included Charlie Conacher, Harvey "Busher" Jackson and Joe Primeau. When they first came together as a line in late 1929, Primeau was the oldest at 23 years old, while Jackson and Conacher were both 18. All three players are members of the Hockey Hall of Fame. All but Primeau was born in Toronto but they all grew up in the city.

Maple Leafs coach Conn Smythe, put the line together, and it helped the Maple Leafs win the 1932 Stanley Cup and lead the Leafs to four more Stanley Cup finals appearances over the next six years. This original line has been featured in a children's book called The Kid Line.

The title was reused as a reference to the Adam Graves, Joe Murphy, and Martin Gelinas lines of the 1990s Edmonton Oilers, and resurrected for Sam Gagner, Andrew Cogliano, and Robert Nilsson starting in 2007-08.

More recently, the title have been used as a reference to other lines, like the Edmonton Oilers - Taylor Hall, Ryan Nugent-Hopkins and Jordan Eberle, starting in 2011-12.
the Montreal Canadiens - Alex Galchenyuk, Lars Eller and Brendan Gallagher starting in 2013-14., the New York islanders - Brock Nelson, Ryan Strome, and Anders Lee, and the New York Rangers -Alexis Lafrenière, Kaapo Kakko, and Filip Chytil in 2021-2022

See also
List of ice hockey line nicknames

References

Nicknamed groups of ice hockey players
History of the Toronto Maple Leafs
History of the Edmonton Oilers
History of the Montreal Canadiens